Figueiredo is a Portuguese parish, located in the municipality of Braga. The population in 2011 was 1,198, in an area of 2.03 km2.

References

Freguesias of Braga